The 1992 Cal Poly Mustangs football team represented California Polytechnic State University during the 1992 NCAA Division II football season.

Cal Poly competed in the Western Football Conference (WFC). The WFC folded after 1992, in part because of a new NCAA rule that prohibited member institutions who competed at the Division I level in other sports to compete at the Division II level in football. Four WFC members (Cal State Northridge, Sacramento State, Cal Poly, & Southern Utah) joined with UC Davis as charter members of the Division-I American West Conference in 1993.

The Mustangs were led by sixth-year head coach Lyle Setencich and played home games at Mustang Stadium in San Luis Obispo, California. They finished the season with a record of four wins, five losses and one tie (4–5–1, 2–3 WFC). Overall, the team outscored its opponents 253–217 for the season.

Schedule

Team players in the NFL
The following Cal Poly Mustang players were selected in the 1993 NFL Draft.

Notes

References

Cal Poly
Cal Poly Mustangs football seasons
Cal Poly Mustangs football